Actinopteri  is the sister group of Cladistia in the class Actinopterygii (ray-finned fish).

Dating back to the Permian period, the Actinopteri comprise the Chondrostei (sturgeons and paddlefish) and the Neopterygii (bowfin, gars, and teleosts). In other words, the Actinopteri include all extant actinopterygians, minus the Polypteridae (bichirs).

Classification
The following cladogram summarizes the evolutionary relationships of extant Actinopteri. Divergence time for each clade in mya are based on:

References

Ray-finned fish taxonomy
Vertebrate unranked clades